The Nagaland Baptist Church Council is a Baptist Christian organization based in Nagaland, India. It is affiliated with the Council of Baptist Churches in Northeast India and the Baptist World Alliance. The headquarters is located in Kohima, the capital of Nagaland.

History

The Nagaland Baptist Church Council has its origins in an American mission of the American Baptist Mission (American Baptist Churches USA) in 1839.

In the late 19th century, various Baptist congregations in the Naga Hills were organised into associations on tribe and linguistic lines. A broader fellowship of the Baptist churches in the Naga Hills first took the forms of the Naga Hills Baptist Church Advisory Board in Kohima. It was renamed as the Naga Hills Baptist Church Council in 1937. In 1950, the council became a founding member of the Council of Baptist Churches in Northeast India.

In 1953, it took the name of Nagaland Baptist Church Council. In 2007, there were 1,347 churches and 454,349 members. 

In 1987, the Mission Conference who took place in the Pfütsero Town Baptist Church approved a global apostolate of 10,000 new missionaries.

Resolutions 
The Third Convention of the NBCC was held at Wokha from 31 January to 2 February 1964. An important resolution passed welcomed the 'proposed Peace Talk between the Government of India and Mr. Phizo.' Another resolution at the convention stated:

Statistics
According to a denomination census released in 2020, it claimed 1,649 churches and 687,442 members. 

Communicant members including children and non-baptized family members are not included in the statistics.

Associations

Associate Members

See also

 Council of Baptist Churches in Northeast India
 List of Christian denominations in North East India
 Longri Ao
 Nagaland Missionary Movement
 Neiliezhü Üsou
 North East India Christian Council

References

External links

Official sites 
 Nagaland Baptist Church Council Official Website

1937 establishments in British India
Christianity in Nagaland
Baptist denominations in India